Lincoln City Football Club is a professional association football club based in the city of Lincoln, Lincolnshire, England.

Nicknamed the "Imps" after the legend of the Lincoln Imp, they have played at 10,120-capacity Sincil Bank since their move from John O'Gaunts in 1895. Traditionally they play in red and white striped shirts with black shorts and red and white socks. They hold rivalries with other Lincolnshire clubs, particularly Scunthorpe United and Grimsby Town. Founded in 1884, Lincoln won the Midland League in 1889–90, their first full season playing league football. They moved on from the Football Alliance to become founder members of the Football League Second Division in 1892, remaining there until they failed re-election in 1908. They won immediate re-election after winning the next year's Midland League, and would repeat this feat after failing re-election again in 1911 and 1920. Founder members of the Football League Third Division North in 1921, they won promotion as champions in 1931–32, but were relegated two seasons later. Crowned Third Division North champions again in 1947–48, they were relegated the next year, but would remain in the second tier for nine seasons after again winning the Third Division North title in 1951–52. Two successive relegations left them in the Fourth Division by 1962, where they would remain until Graham Taylor's title winning campaign of 1975–76.

Relegated in 1978–79, they secured promotion again two years later but suffered a double relegation to find themselves in the Conference by 1987. Lincoln made an immediate recovery however, regaining their Football League status with the Conference title in 1987–88. They were promoted again in 1997–98, but were relegated the next season. They reached the play-offs in five consecutive seasons, from 2002 to 2007, losing in the final twice (2002–03 and 2004–05) and the semi-finals three times, which is a competition record. However they exited the division at the other end when they were returned to the Conference after relegation at the end of the 2010–11 campaign. A six-season stay in non-league was ended when Cowley brothers Nicky and Danny led the club to the National League title in 2016–17, as well as a run to the quarter-finals of the FA Cup – this made them the first non-league side to reach that stage in 103 years. They won the EFL Trophy in 2018 and the League Two title in 2018–19.

History

Football in the city of Lincoln had been prominent since the 1860s although not strictly connected to the modern day club. After the disbanding of Lincoln Rovers (formerly Lincoln Recreation) in 1884, Lincoln City FC was formed as an amateur football association, and the first game Lincoln played was an emphatic 9–1 victory over local rivals Sleaford, on 4 October 1884. Originally they played at the John O'Gaunts ground, provided by wealthy local brewer Robert Dawber.

Lincoln turned professional in the 1891–92 season, and soon helped to form what was then the Second Division in 1892–93 season, as an increasing number of clubs wished to join the Football League. Their first game in the Football League was a 4–2 away defeat to Sheffield United on 3 September 1892. Their first home game was also against Sheffield United, this time, however, Lincoln won 1–0. Due to Dawber's death in 1895, Lincoln moved from the John O'Gaunts Ground to Sincil Bank.

They failed re-election to the Football League in 1908. They won immediate re-election after winning the next year's Midland League, and would repeat this feat after failing re-election again in 1911 and 1920. Founder members of the Football League Third Division North in 1921, they won promotion as champions in 1931–32, but were relegated two seasons later. Crowned Third Division North champions again in 1947–48, they were relegated the next year, but would remain in the second tier for nine seasons after again winning the Third Division North title in 1951–52. Two successive relegations left them in the Fourth Division by 1962, where they would remain until Graham Taylor's title winning campaign of 1975–76. The next  would oscillate between the Third and Fourth division for the next 10 years, missing out on promotion to the Second Division in 1982 and 1983.

Lincoln were relegated to the Fourth Division at the end of the 1985–86 season, and the year after that they became the first team to suffer automatic relegation from the Football League. They regained their Football League place automatically via promotion as champions of the Conference at the first attempt. In the 1997–98 season, Lincoln were promoted from the Third Division (previously the Fourth Division), but were immediately relegated back on the next season. On 3 May 2002 Lincoln entered into administration. Lincoln City were relegated again from League Two on the last day of the end of the 2010–11 season after a home defeat to Aldershot Town.

In the 2016–17 season, Lincoln City under Danny Cowley were promoted as champions back to the Football League. In the 2016–17 FA Cup, Lincoln beat Championship side Ipswich Town, in a replay, after progressing past Guiseley, Altrincham and Oldham Athletic, before defeating Championship leaders Brighton and Hove Albion at Sincil Bank to make the fifth round of the FA Cup for the first time since the end of the Victorian era. On 18 February, Lincoln went on to beat top flight side Burnley 1–0 to historically go through to the FA Cup quarter-final, the first time a non-league club had progressed to the last eight since 1914. In the quarter-finals, they were defeated 5–0 at Arsenal.

On 6 February 2018, Lincoln beat Chelsea U21s in the semi-final of the 2017–18 EFL Trophy, taking them to Wembley Stadium for the first time. They went on to win the Final against Shrewsbury Town on 8 April 2018. The winning goal was scored by Elliot Whitehouse in the 16th minute and was the only goal of the match. On 12 May, Lincoln drew 0–0 with Exeter City in the first leg of the League Two play-offs. In the second leg, on 17 May, Lincoln lost 3–1.

On 5 April 2019, Lincoln announced that Nettleham Ladies FC would be rebranded as Lincoln City Women from 1 June. Lincoln were confirmed as the champions of League Two on 22 April 2019, after a 0–0 draw against Tranmere Rovers, having been top of the table since 25 August 2018. Promotion from League Two represented Lincoln's first season in the third tier since the 1998–99 campaign.

On 9 September 2019, manager Danny Cowley announced his departure to join Championship side Huddersfield Town, having guided Lincoln to two promotions in his previous three seasons alongside brother and assistant manager Nicky. On 20 September 2019, Lincoln appointed Michael Appleton as their first team coach. Due to the COVID-19 pandemic, Football League matches were suspended on 13 March 2020 with Lincoln in 15th place. Clubs voted to end the season in June 2020 with final league positions decided on a points per game basis with Lincoln subsequently being placed in 16th.

In the 2020–21 season, Lincoln finished the season in 5th place, qualifying for the play-offs. Lincoln faced Sunderland in the play-offs, the first match fans could attend since the COVID-19 pandemic which Lincoln won 2–0. In the second leg, Sunderland took a 2–0 lead to level the tie, however, Tom Hopper scored to send the Imps into the play-off Final. On 30 May 2021, Lincoln faced Blackpool in the 2021 EFL League One play-off Final at Wembley Stadium. Lincoln took the lead after 50 seconds thanks to an own goal from Ollie Turton, however, Blackpool hit back with two goals from either side of half time from Kenny Dougall as Lincoln missed out on promotion.

Stadium

The club have played at Sincil Bank since 1895. Previously, Lincoln City had played at the nearby John O'Gaunts ground since the club's 1884 inception. Sincil Bank has an overall capacity of 10,120 and is colloquially known to fans as "The Bank". It is overlooked by Lincoln Cathedral. Former Lincoln City chairman John Reames re-purchased the ground from the local council in 2000 at a cost of £175,000. The club had sold it in 1982 for £225,000 to fend off the threat of eviction, arranging a 125-year lease.

Sincil Bank hosted England U16's 2–0 win over the Scotland U16 team in the Victory Shield on 28 November 2008. Martin Peters paraded the FIFA World Cup Trophy at the ground in March 2010 as part of its global tour. FA WSL club Lincoln Ladies played home games at Sincil Bank in their 2011 season. The Ladies' club had previously hosted Arsenal Ladies there in an FA Women's Cup semi-final in March 2008.

Rivals

Lincoln City is one of three professional football clubs in Lincolnshire.  Lincoln City's main rivals are Grimsby Town and Scunthorpe United, which at various points fans have considered one bigger than the other.  Other prominent Lincolnshire rivals of the past include Gainsborough Trinity and Boston United, however meetings are nowadays limited between the clubs.

Nottinghamshire clubs Mansfield Town and Notts County are also considered rivals, and Peterborough United, Hull City and York City are clubs that have had some sort of rivalry with The Imps in the past.  Lincoln United, the other football club based in Lincoln, are further down the footballing pyramid and are not a considered rival.

Badge and colours

Badge

Lincoln City currently sport a "traditional" Lincoln Imp badge, synonymous with the success of the 1970s and 1980s. The badge was returned in 2014, with general manager John Vickers billing it the start of a "new era". Between the two spells the club used two badges, the first of which being the city's heraldic shield with the letters "L.C.F.C" inscribed onto it. This badge was used until 2001, when the club used a similar design; however, it featured a yellow imp in the centre, with the nickname of "The Imps" written across.

Colours
Traditionally, the colours and design of the Lincoln City strip are a red and white striped shirt along with black shorts and red socks. This varied in the late 1960s and early 70s, the club opted to field a predominantly red strip with white shorts, and also in the 2000–01 season when the shirt was quartered red and white with white shorts. Currently, the home kit is largely red with white pinstriping down the length of the shirt, as well as black and white accents around the collar and cuff of the shirt. The shorts of the kit are also largely black, sporting red accents, and the socks red with black and white accents. Their away kit has never retained any single pattern or design, and areas varied vastly throughout the seasons, but is currently black across the shirt, shorts and socks with red accents on the edges of each piece. In recent years, the club have also released a third kit. Currently, the kit is green in colour, with a chevron pattern across it. This kit features white accents on the shirt, and white shorts with green accents.

Kit suppliers and shirt sponsors
The following tables detail the kit suppliers and sponsors of Lincoln City by year:

Current squad

First team

Out on loan

Under 18s squad

Work Experience loans

Club management

Board members

Backroom staff

Managerial history

Honours and achievements

Honours
Lincoln City's honours include:

League
Third Division North / League One (Tier 3)
Champions (3): 1931–32, 1947–48, 1951–52
Runners-up: 1927–28, 1930–31, 1936–37
Play-off finalists: 2020–21

Fourth Division / League Two (Tier 4)
Champions (2): 1975–76, 2018–19
Runners-up: 1980–81
Third place: 1997–98
Play-off finalists: 2002–03, 2004–05

Conference / National League (Tier 5)
Champions (2): 1987–88, 2016–17

Cups
Football League Trophy
Winners (1): 2017–18

Football League Group Trophy
Runners-up: 1982–83

Conference Championship Shield
Winners (1): 1988

Other/Youth and Reserve
Lincolnshire Senior Cup
Winners (38): 1886–87, 1890–91, 1891–92, 1893–94, 1907–08, 1909–10, 1911–12, 1913–14, 1914–15, 1919–20, 1921–22, 1923–24, 1925–26, 1926–27, 1930–31, 1931–32, 1933–34, 1934–35, 1945–46, 1947–48, 1948–49, 1950–51, 1955–566, 1961–62, 1963–646, 1965–666, 1966–67, 1968–69, 1969–70, 1974–75, 1980–81, 1981–82, 1984–85, 1990–91, 1997–98, 2004–05, 2006–07, 2009–10, 2013–14,
Runners-up (32): 1892–93, 1894–95, 1896–97, 1900–01, 1902–03, 1903–04, 1908–09, 1912–13, 1920–21, 1922–23, 1925–26, 1927–28, 1928–29, 1929–30, 1932–33, 1935–36, 1936–37, 1937–38, 1946–47, 1949–50, 1951–52, 1954–55, 1958–59, 1959–60, 1976–77, 1978–79, 1985–86, 2007–08, 2009–10, 2010–11, 2011–12, 2014–15

Pontin's Reserve League Cup
Winners: 2006–07

Fred Green Memorial Trophy3
Winners: 2006–07

John Reames Memorial Trophy
Winners: 2013–14

Midland League / Central League
Winners: 1889–90, 1908–09, 1911–125, 1920–21
Runners-up: 1932–33
Third-place: 1928–29

Highest finishes
Highest league finish
5th in Football League Second Division (second tier): 1901–02

FA Cup
Quarter-finals: 2016–17

EFL Cup
4th round: 1967–68, 2022–23

FA Trophy
Semi-finals: 2016–17

Club records
Record league attendance: 5 March 1949 v. Grimsby Town – 23,146
Record cup attendance: 15 November 1967 v. Derby County – 23,196
Record transfer fee paid: Dean Walling – £75,000 to Carlisle United, 1997, Tony Battersby – £75,000 to Bury, 1998. John Akinde is believed to have cost more, but the fee was never disclosed.
Record transfer fee received: Jack Hobbs – >£750,0002 from Liverpool, 2005
Record league victory: 11–1 v. Crewe Alexandra (Home), The Football League, 29 September 1951
Record cup victory: 0–13 v. Peterborough United (Away), FA Cup, 12 October 1895
Record appearances: Grant Brown – 469
Record goal scorer: Andy Graver – 143 (1950–55, 1958–61)
Record goals in one season: Allan Hall – 45 (1931–32)
Youngest player: Shane Nicholson – 16 years and 112 days v. Charlton Athletic, 23 September 1986, League Cup
Oldest player: Albert Iremonger – 42 years and 312 days v. Doncaster Rovers, 23 April 1927, Football League

Source

Notes

External links

Official Lincoln City website

 
Football clubs in Lincolnshire
Football clubs in England
Sport in Lincoln, England
Association football clubs established in 1884
1884 establishments in England
English Football League clubs
National League (English football) clubs
EFL Trophy winners